The Chinese Elm cultivar Ulmus parvifolia 'Catlin' is a dwarf variety specifically raised as a bonsai plant by John Catlin, La Canada, California, circa 1950.

Description
The leaves are very small, < 12 mm long, and can remain evergreen on pot grown plants in California.

Cultivation
The cultivar is not known to have been introduced to Europe or Australasia.

Accessions

North America

Brooklyn Botanic Garden , New York, US.  Acc. no. 900380.
New York Botanical Garden, US. Acc. no. 1133/89
U S National Arboretum , Washington, D.C., US. Acc. no. 64443.

Nurseries

North America

Japan Nursery , US.

References

External links
 http://rbg-web2.rbge.org.uk/multisite/multisite3.php Multi-site search engine

Chinese elm cultivar
Flora of China
Garden plants of Asia
Plants used in bonsai
Ulmus articles missing images
Ulmus